William Beaumont Army Medical Center is a Department of Defense medical facility located in Fort Bliss, Texas. It provides comprehensive care to all beneficiaries including active duty military, their family members, and retirees. The hospital is located in the Central/Northeastern part of El Paso, and provides emergency department services for Northeast El Paso. The current 1.1-million-square-foot, 6-building medical complex opened July 10, 2021 on East Fort Bliss. WBAMC is affiliated with the Paul L. Foster School of Medicine which is also located in El Paso, Texas. WBAMC is also a participating hospital for medical residents from the Uniformed Services University of the Health Sciences (USU) and nursing students from the University of Texas at El Paso School of Nursing and the El Paso Community College Nursing School.  The current commander of WBAMC is Colonel Brett Venable.

History

The William Beaumont Army Medical Center (WBAMC), formerly the William Beaumont General Hospital (WBGH), is currently situated northwest of Fort Bliss' main cantonment area, between Fred Wilson Road and Hayes Avenue.  The hospital has its beginnings in Fort Bliss during the 1850s.  After several earlier moves, Fort Bliss moved to its permanent location at La Noria Mesa in 1893.  The hospital is named for Army surgeon William Beaumont (1785–1853), the "Father of Gastric Physiology".

Early years (1849–1892)
From its beginnings in 1849, the medical units that supported the Army installation in El Paso have moved several times.  In January 1854, "The Post of El Paso del Norte", was established on Magoffin's Ranch.  This installation at Magoffin's Ranch formally became known as Fort Bliss on 8 March 1854, in honor of Lt. Col. William Wallace Smith Bliss a veteran of the Mexican–American War (1846–1848) who was cited for gallantry in action.  In 1868 the Army installation was moved to Camp Concordia; back to downtown El Paso in 1878; to Hart's Mill in the 1880s; and finally to La Noria Mesa in 1893 on land donated by El Paso citizens. The La Noria Mesa site remains as the permanent station for Fort Bliss and its medical units.

Remains of the original Army Hospital located at Hart's Mill were uncovered by archaeologists in 2012 near the main campus of University of Texas at El Paso.  The Army used military labor to construct the post hospital at Hart's Mill, which was completed in December 1880.

Civil War – under control of Confederate Army (1861–1862)
Fort Bliss was directed to surrender to Confederate forces on 31 Mar 1861 after Texas withdrew from the Union, to include the garrison hospital. Fort Bliss and the hospital remained Confederate until 20 Aug 1862. The retreating Confederate troops destroyed all of Fort Bliss, except for the hospital, which housed their sick and wounded.

Formative years (1893–1898)

The 1890s saw the establishment of a permanent hospital at Fort Bliss in support of a permanent regimental post along the border. Twenty-nine buildings and a parade ground are extant from this period on Fort Bliss and contribute to the Fort Bliss Main Post Historic District, to include the Fort Bliss Fort Hospital, completed in 1893.  This building, now known as Building 8,  is currently the location of the Fort Bliss Inspector General's Office.  It was added to the National Register of Historic Places on February 23, 1972.

Spanish–American War (1898–1902)
During this period, the hospital supported a skeletal garrison at Fort Bliss, containing never more than 100 soldiers. It was not until 1902 and the end of the Philippine Insurrection that the hospital supported a full complement of troops at Fort Bliss.  By 1902 the hospital, along with all the buildings on Fort Bliss, had fallen into disrepair. Lieutenant Colonel H.H. Adams, of the 18th Infantry Regiment, commanded the post in 1902 and reported the hospital steward's quarters needed "extensive repairs."

New Fort Bliss post hospital (1903–1919)

In his 1903 report, the inspector general found the Fort Bliss hospital was one of several in the Department of Texas showing "defective construction due to inferior material or poor workmanship, or both." The commander of the Department of Texas agreed in the same year, "A new hospital at Fort Bliss is undoubtedly needed." In the summer of 1904, a new department commander, Brigadier General Jesse M. Lee, toured Fort Bliss and wrote a report generally critical of the post. Lee reported a new hospital was being built.

On 1 December 1917, field hospital company 3 departed Fort Bliss, then sailed from Hoboken on 5 December, and arrived at Saint-Nazaire on 22 December, among the last elements of the 1st Infantry Division to arrive in France and later the Western Front.

The first Army dental training school was established at the Fort Bliss Post Hospital in September 1916 by Captain Robert T. Oliver.  The dental school at the Fort Bliss Post Hospital served as a model for similar efforts in the mobilization camps after the April 6, 1917 declaration of war against Germany.

William Beaumont General Hospital (1920–1939)

General Orders No. 40 of the War Department, June 26, 1920, stipulated that this new hospital at Fort Bliss be named after Major William Beaumont, one of the most famous surgeons of the "Old Army."  William Beaumont General Hospital opened on July 1, 1921, and was completed in 1922. It originally consisted of 41 buildings and 403 beds, with an emergency reserve of 100 additional beds.  The new hospital buildings were made of tile and stucco.

The construction of WBGH's 48 buildings in 1920–21 signaled the beginning of Fort Bliss's role as a major military medical center. Over the next two decades WBGH served as both Fort Bliss's station hospital and as a general hospital for the western portion of the Army's 8th Service Command.  On staff were six medical officers, two nurses and 30 medical corpsmen.  WBGH's original mission was to provide general medical care to border patrol troops stationed at Fort Bliss.  By the 1930s, however, the hospital was serving the entire western portion of the Army's Eighth Corps area, providing health care to soldiers stationed at posts in Arizona, New Mexico, and western Texas.

World War II and after (1940–1968)

WBGH served as one of many prisoner-of-war hospitals across the United States that supported the prisoner-of-war camps at Fort Bliss and surrounding camps during World War II.

During early 1945, approximately 6,000 inpatients were treated. In addition, a military school for medical technicians offered specialized training in surgical, dental, laboratory, x-ray, pharmacy, and veterinary procedures. The hospital had a fully equipped physical therapy and occupational therapy center. Also, the artificial eye clinic was opened. Later, the hospital expanded into a neuro-psychiatric treatment and orthopedic surgery center.  Following the war, WBGH continued to serve the medical needs of Fort Bliss and surrounding military installations until the Army's needs outgrew the capacity of the hospital.  During the war, the William Beaumont General Hospital trained approximately 16,000 medical technicians, including over a thousand WAC recruits.  The hospital also became a specialty center for plastic surgery, ophthalmic surgery, neuropsychiatry, and deep radiation therapy.  In the last year of the war alone, some 26,358 patients received medical treatment at the hospital.

In late 1945, Wernher von Braun and the original 82 members of the Project Paperclip group used one of the old WBGH buildings as their initial laboratory and headquarters as noted by an Army historian:

Beaumont was one of only ten of the Army's sixty-three general hospitals retained after World War II.  Besides providing medical care to returning wounded soldiers during the conflicts in both Korea and Vietnam, the hospital also provided general medicine and surgical services to veterans and personnel at Fort Bliss and other regional military installations.

William Beaumont Army Medical Center (1969–present)

In 1969, the Army began construction of a new, 12-story hospital to the west of the WBGH area.  Completed in 1972, the new facility became known as the William Beaumont Army Medical Center.  The building is in the modernism architectural style, with a 124 ft tower.  Although originally designed for 611 beds, by the early 1980s the hospital had a capacity of 463. The Omar N. Bradley building, an addition to the west-side of the main hospital, was opened in 1982; it provides an additional  of clinical and administrative space. Today, the hospital has a bed capacity for more than 150 patients; during contingencies, the hospital can expand for 373 patients.  As the Southwest's major regional Army medical center, this modern facility now provides medical care to active and retired military personnel and their dependents in the three-state region of Texas, New Mexico, and Arizona.

Maj. Gen. (Dr.) Charles C. Pixley, the hospital commander from September 1975 through December 1976, was promoted to lieutenant general in 1977 and became the Surgeon General of the Army.

Fisher House
The Fisher House Foundation, which provides free lodging for military families with a hospitalized relative, operates a facility at WBAMC.  It celebrated its 20th anniversary of operation on 22 February 2014.

Unit insignia
The design of the WBAMC unit insignia symbolizes some of the highlights of WBAMC's namesake Dr. William Beaumont, Beaumont's patient Alexis St. Martin, the unit's medical tradition, and the unit's location in El Paso.

The fleur-de-lis pointing north refers to Dr. Beaumont's assignment in 1820 to the Northern Michigan outpost of Fort Mackinac.  The circular window at center of the cross refers to Alexis St. Martin's stomach wound which never closed, presenting Beaumont with a window through which he could study the workings of the human stomach.  The white and maroon colors are traditional to the US Army Medical Department.  The Maltese cross refers to the Knights Hospitallers of medieval times as a symbol of the medical profession.  WBAMC's location in El Paso, Texas is symbolized by the vertical arm of the cross passing between the mountains (in reference to the English translation of El Paso as "the pass") and terminating upon the blue wave which represents the Rio Grande.

Notable patients
 Omar N. Bradley, the last American five-star general, lived during his retirement at a special residence at the William Beaumont Army Medical Center.
 William O. Wooldridge, the first Sergeant Major of the Army was treated at WBAMC
 Several of the Prisoner of War (POWs) from the 2003 invasion of Iraq were treated at WBAMC.

Co-located Veterans Health Care Center
The El Paso VA Health Care System has a joint venture with William Beaumont Army Medical Center.  This joint venture allows both activities to maximize resource utilization.  Through the joint venture, VA purchases emergency department service and inpatient care for acute medical, psychiatric and surgical emergencies.  The joint venture has led to unique agreements that have increased patient access in general surgery and vascular surgery.

See also
 MEDCOM
 Uniformed Services University of the Health Sciences
 Paul L. Foster School of Medicine
 Dr. William Beaumont
 Major General (Dr.) Charles C. Pixley
 Fort Bliss
 General Omar Bradley
 Sergeant Major of the Army William O. Wooldridge

References

External links
 William Beaumont Army Medical Center, official website
 Paul L. Foster School of Medicine
 
 William Beaumont Army Medical Center, Graduate Medical Education

This article contains information that originally came from US Government publications and websites and is in the public domain.

United States Army medical installations
Military hospitals in the United States
Hospitals in Texas
Hospital buildings completed in 1849
Hospital buildings completed in 1893
Hospital buildings completed in 1904
Hospital buildings completed in 1921
Hospital buildings completed in 1972
Military facilities in Texas
Buildings and structures in El Paso, Texas
Hospitals established in 1849
1849 establishments in Texas
Teaching hospitals in Texas
Hospital buildings on the National Register of Historic Places in Texas
National Register of Historic Places in El Paso County, Texas
Training installations of the United States Army
Healthcare
El Paso, Texas
Fort Bliss